Panasesa Island  is located in Milne Bay Province, Papua New Guinea, 500 km to the east of Port Moresby, the nation's capital. Panasesa Island has an eco resort with small staff.

Geography  
Panasesa Island  is part of Conflict Group atoll in Louisiade Archipelago.
It is situated just north of larger Irai Island. The land of Island is flat.  The highest point on the island is 18 meters above sea level.  It covers about 1.2 km from the north to the south and 1.0 km from the east to the west.

Due to island location tropical weather prevails.

References 

Islands of Milne Bay Province
Louisiade Archipelago